Kyōka Okamura was the defending champion, but lost in the second round to Miharu Imanishi.

Laura Robson won the title, defeating Katie Boulter in an all-British final, 6–3, 6–4.

Seeds

Draw

Finals

Top half

Bottom half

References
Main Draw

Kurume U.S.E Cup - Singles
Kurume Best Amenity Cup